The Port of Magdalla is a port in western India, located on the southern bank of the Tapi River, around 10 km from Surat. It is operated by Gujarat Maritime Board.

About the Port
It is a medium-sized port. There are various types of vessels regularly approaching Magdalla Port for General Cargo (57%), and Cement Carrier (23%). The maximum length of the vessel recorded to having entered this port is 294 meters. The maximum draught at the port is 4.2 meters. Maximum deadweight is 3872t.

References

See also 
List of tourist attractions in Surat
Surat Metropolitan Region

Economy of Surat
Magdalla
Surat district